Cheryl Dumesnil (born 1969) is an American author, poet and editor. She is a frequent contributor to The Huffington Post. Her poems and essays have appeared in Indiana Review, Barrow Street, Calyx, and Literary Mama. She frequently writes about suburbia, parenthood, and lesbian issues.

Dumesnil was awarded the 2008 Agnes Lynch Starrett Poetry Prize for her first full-length book, In Praise of Falling.

Dumesnil received her MFA in creative writing from Syracuse University and taught at Santa Clara University from 1994 to 2001. She lives in Walnut Creek, California with her wife and two sons.

Selected publications

Sample works
 "Bernal Heights", Verse Daily
 
 "In Praise of Falling", "Narrative"

Books
  (memoir)
  (poetry)
  (poetry)

Anthologies

Editor

References

1969 births
Living people
American lesbian writers
Agnes Lynch Starrett Poetry Prize winners
American women poets
21st-century American poets
21st-century American women writers
21st-century American LGBT people